Natasha Subhash (born September 2, 2001) is an inactive American tennis player. 

Subhash has won two singles titles and two doubles titles on the ITF Women's Circuit in her career. She made her WTA Tour main-draw debut at the 2018 Citi Open in doubles, partnering with Alana Smith.

Subhash has been playing college tennis at the University of Virginia.

ITF Circuit finals

Singles: 3 (2 titles, 1 runner-up)

Doubles: 2 (2 titles)

References

External links
 
 

Living people
2001 births
American female tennis players
American sportspeople of Indian descent
Indian-American tennis players
Sportspeople from Fairfax, Virginia
Tennis people from Virginia
Virginia Cavaliers women's tennis players